The 1868 United States presidential election in Vermont took place on November 3, 1868, as part of the 1868 United States presidential election. Voters chose five representatives, or electors to the Electoral College, who voted for president and vice president.

Vermont voted for the Republican nominee, Ulysses S. Grant, over the Democratic nominee, Horatio Seymour. Grant won the state by a margin of 57.14%. 

With 78.57% of the popular vote, Vermont would be Grant's strongest victory in terms of percentage in the popular vote. In addition, Grant's performance in Vermont in popular vote percentage was the second best for a Republican presidential candidate only after William McKinley's 80.08% in 1896. Grant's performance in Addison County is also the last time that a Republican, or any candidate, has received over 90% in a Vermont county, and one of only two occasions (along with Abraham Lincoln's performance in Addison four years earlier) that a candidate has done so despite the state's overwhelming Republican dominance for nearly a century.

Results

See also
 United States presidential elections in Vermont

References

Vermont
1868
1868 Vermont elections